Ole Anton Qvam (5 August 1834 – 8 July 1904) was a Norwegian lawyer and Liberal politician, who was the Norwegian minister of Justice 1891–1893, 1898–1899 and 1900–1902, minister of the Interior 1899–1900, as well as head of the ministry of Auditing, ministry of Agriculture and ministry of Justice in 1900, and Norwegian prime minister in Stockholm 1902–1903.

Biography
Ole Anton Qvam was born in Bolsøy in today's Molde in Romsdal, Norway. He was the son of Ole Larsen Qvam (1782–1844) and Johanne Pedersdatter Ryen (1797–1850). Qvam worked as a teacher in Christiania, Arendal and Setesdal.  He began studying law at the University of Christiania and became cand.jur. 1862. He founded the Sparbu and Egge savings bank in 1872, where he was chairman of the board 1873–1886. Mayor of Egge from 1869 to 1885.

Qvam was  elected to the Storting for Nordre Trondhjems (Nord-Trøndelag) from 1874 to 1885  and for Søndre Trondhjems (Sør-Trøndelag) from 1885 to 1888. He served as president of the Odelstinget from 1886 to 1888.
Qvam was Minister of Justice in the first government of Johannes Steen  from March 6, 1891 to May 1, 1893, and later also Justice Minister of Johannes Steen's second government from February 17, 1898 to April 1899. On April 21, 1902, Qvam  became Norway's Prime Minister in Stockholm during the first government of Otto Blehr.

Personal life
He was married to feminist pioneer Fredrikke Marie Qvam (1843-1938) who was President of the Norwegian Association for Women's Rights and founded the Norwegian Women's Public Health Association. Both he and his wife were co-founders of the Norwegian Association for Women's Rights in 1884. He retired from government during 1903. He died at Egge  on July 8, 1904.

References 

1834 births
1904 deaths
People from Molde
University of Oslo alumni
Norwegian educators
19th-century Norwegian lawyers
Government ministers of Norway
Members of the Storting
Ministers of Agriculture and Food of Norway
19th-century Norwegian politicians
Recipients of the St. Olav's Medal
Norwegian Association for Women's Rights people
Ministers of Justice of Norway